Greg Avery  is a British animal rights activist.  His latest involvement is with Stop Huntingdon Animal Cruelty (SHAC), an international campaign to force the closure of Huntingdon Life Sciences (HLS), an animal testing company based in the UK and US.

Early life
Avery was born and raised near Buxton in Derbyshire, one of six brothers. He joined the animal rights movement at the age of 15, and has devoted himself to it full-time ever since.

Arrests and convictions

On 1 May 2007, after a series of raids involving 700 police officers in England, Amsterdam, and Belgium, 32 people linked to SHAC were arrested, including Avery and Dellemagne, who were charged with conspiracy to blackmail in connection with the SHAC campaign. 

He was also served with an indefinite ASBO, restricting his future contact with companies targeted in the campaign.

See also
Veganism
List of animal rights advocates

Notes

Further reading
Vegan Prisoners Support Group (VPSG)

1963 births
Living people
Animal Liberation Front
British activists
British animal rights activists
British criminals
British prisoners and detainees
Prisoners and detainees of England and Wales